means "widening" in Spanish. It is used to name the development areas of Spanish cities around the end of the 19th century, when the demographic explosion and the Industrial Revolution prompted the tearing down of the old city wall and the construction of neighborhoods under grid plans.

Background
The program of city extensions in Spain began simultaneously in 1860 with the plans for Barcelona by Ildefons Cerdà and Madrid by Carlos María de Castro, influenced by Haussmann's transformation of Paris from 1852 (and, in turn, have been said to have influenced Haussmann's later projects).  Those  extended cities beyond their traditional limits by demolishing city walls, transforming riverbanks and subdividing the  – rural land outside the city walls.  were generally based on principles articulated by Cerdà. These included reserving significant open space by requiring mid-block open space and whole block parks.  The height of buildings was set by reference to the width of the adjacent street.  Many of these requirements were modified, and the building volumes increased, by later amendments beginning in 1864 (Madrid).

It is specifically used for:
The  (Catalan for ) of Barcelona, planned by Cerdà
The  of the city of Valencia.
The  in Palma, Mallorca.
The  of Madrid under the Plan Castro by Carlos María de Castro enacted by Royal Decree in 1860.
The Ensanche de Bilbao after the annexation of the former village of Abando.

References 

Urban planning in Spain
19th century in Spain